Dioryctria fordi is a species of snout moth in the genus Dioryctria. It was described by Julian P. Donahue and Herbert H. Neunzig in 2002 and is known from the US state of California.

Adults are on wing from June to October.

The larvae possibly feed on Pinus sabiniana.

References

Moths described in 2002
Endemic fauna of California
Moths of North America
fordi
Fauna without expected TNC conservation status